St. Andrew's Episcopal Church is a historic church at 1231 Washington Boulevard in Stamford, Connecticut.  Built in 1860 and consecrated on May 8, 1861, Saint Andrew's Church was originally a mission of St. John's Church Stamford until its incorporation as a parish on June 12, 1865. Saint Andrew's was the first free church in the diocese where parishioners did not have to pay a pew rental fee. St. Andrew's  was listed on the National Register of Historic Places in 1983 as St. Andrew's Protestant Episcopal Church.  Its church and parish hall are fine examples of Gothic architecture designed by Henry Hudson Holly.

Current use
St. Andrew's Episcopal Church is an active Anglo-Catholic parish in the Episcopal Diocese of Connecticut. Mass is celebrated on weekdays Monday through Friday according to the Anglican Missal.

Sunday services include a Low Mass followed by a Sung Mass. All services at St. Andrew's Church are celebrated in traditional language, facing eastward. Music for services comes from both The Hymnal 1982 and Lift Every Voice and Sing II: An African American Hymnal.

Clergy

 Francis Windsor Brathwaite (1865–1906)
 John Dolby Skene (1906–1920)
 Harley Wright Smith (1920–1927)
 Kenneth Ripley [last name illegible] 1936
 Percy Major Binnington (1941–1956)
 Richard Johnson (1956–1964)
 Norman Catir (1964–1970)
 Thomas George Peterson (1970–1974)
 Mark Anthony DeWolf (1975–1998)
 Richard Alton (2007–2014)
 Bartlett W. Gage (2014–current)

See also

 St. Andrew's Episcopal Church
 National Register of Historic Places listings in Stamford, Connecticut

References

External links
St Andrew's Church, Stamford

Anglo-Catholic church buildings in the United States
Churches on the National Register of Historic Places in Connecticut
Episcopal church buildings in Connecticut
Churches in Stamford, Connecticut
National Register of Historic Places in Fairfield County, Connecticut